Clement Township may refer to the following places in the United States:

 Clement Township, Clinton County, Illinois
 Clement Township, Michigan

Township name disambiguation pages